Jordy Gillekens (born 18 February 2000) is a Belgian professional footballer who plays for Lierse Kempenzonen in the Belgian First Division B.

Gillekens made his professional debut for OH Leuven on 5 August 2017 in the home match against Lierse.

Personal 
Gillekens played together with his older brother Nick Gillekens at OH Leuven until 2019.

References 

2000 births
Living people
Belgian footballers
Association football defenders
Oud-Heverlee Leuven players
Lierse Kempenzonen players
Belgian Pro League players
Challenger Pro League players
ACF Fiorentina players